The SDEP (Street events Data Exchange Protocol) comprises an XML data schema and web service WSDL for exchanging information about streetworks, roadworks, and street events between systems.

Elgin was funded by the UK NeSDS Government e-Standards Programme to conduct a consultation and convene meetings to define the requirements of a common data exchange protocol for streetworks registers and other systems handling street events data. SDEP was developed to allow the open exchange of such data between back office systems used by local authorities to manage their highway networks in order to enable e-Government and streetworks co-ordination.

The SDEP consultation group comprised ELGIN (Chair), Mayrise Ltd., Symology Ltd., Pitney Bowes Inc., Exor Corporation (Bentley Systems), Office of the Deputy Prime Minister and Transport for London, with the National Traffic Control Centre in an observing capacity.

See also
Office of the Deputy Prime Minister
Transport for London
National Traffic Control Centre

External links
SDEP technical documentation including an XML schema and WSDL

XML markup languages
Web service specifications
World Wide Web Consortium standards
Technical communication
Computer file formats
Open formats
Data modeling languages
Data serialization formats
Application layer protocols
Presentation layer protocols